Zofia Czernow (born 1950) is an economist and Polish politician. Previously involved in local politics in Jelenia Góra, she was elected to the Sejm,  lower house of the Polish parliament, in 2011, 2015, 2019.

References

1950 births
Living people
People from Biłgoraj County
Civic Platform politicians
Members of the Polish Sejm 2011–2015
Members of the Polish Sejm 2015–2019
Members of the Polish Sejm 2019–2023